is the twenty-fourth single, and first re-cut single, by Japanese recording artist Alisa Mizuki. It was released on August 17, 2011, over three years and a half since "Engaged" (2008), as the first and only single from Mizuki's sixth studio album, SpeciAlisa. The single was issued in two formats: CD+DVD edition and CD-only edition.

The title track was written and composed by singer-songwriter Yuka Kawamura and served as theme song for the TBS drama Hanawake no Yon-shimai, starring Mizuki herself. CDJournal described "Hoshi no Hate" as a "ballad about marriage and family ties" that is "well-suited for the drama series it is used in." The B-side, "Alisa in Wonderland," was produced by Micro from Def Tech and is also featured on SpeciAlisa. The CD+DVD edition of the single includes the music videos for both songs.

"Hoshi no Hate" debuted and peaked at number 117 on the Oricon Weekly Singles chart and charted for only one week, selling 577 copies in total.

Track listing

Charts

References 

2011 singles
Alisa Mizuki songs
Japanese television drama theme songs